The Kendallville Terminal Railway (reporting marks KTR) is a Class III common carrier owned by Pioneer Railcorp, in Northern Indiana. The line runs for 1.1 miles in Kendallville, Indiana and also connects with Norfolk Southern Railway in Kendallville. The main products shipped on the line include sugar and syrup.

References

External links
 

Indiana railroads
Railway companies established in 1996
Spin-offs of the Norfolk Southern Railway
1996 establishments in Indiana
Pioneer Lines